The 2019–20 Nicholls Colonels women's basketball team represented Nicholls State University during the 2019–20 NCAA Division I women's basketball season. The Colonels, led by twelfth year head coach DoBee Plaisance, played their home games at Stopher Gym as members of the Southland Conference. They finished the season 13–16, 10–10 in Southland play to finish in seventh place. Before they could play in the Southland women's tournament however, the tournament was cancelled due to the coronavirus pandemic.

Previous season
The Colonels finished the 2018–19 season 20–12, 14–4 in Southland play to finish in third place. They lost to Texas A&M–Corpus Christi in the second round of the Southland women's tournament.  They received an invitation to the 2019 Women's Basketball Invitational tournament where they lost in the first round to Southern Miss.

Roster
Sources:

Schedule
Sources:

|-
!colspan=12 style=";"| Non-conference regular season

|-
!colspan=12 style=";"| Southland regular season

|-
!colspan=12 style=| 2020 Hercules Tires Southland Basketball Tournament
|-

See also
2019–20 Nicholls Colonels men's basketball team

References

Nicholls Colonels women's basketball seasons
Nicholls State
Nicholls
Nicholls